Puntas are a traditional dish of Mexican cuisine. It consists of small cuts of meat cooked in various Mexican sauces, either of dried chili or fresh chilis sauces. Initially, the tips were made with strips of leftover beef cut, known as puntas de filete. Then, different types of meat have been used.

References

Bibliography
 Muñoz Zurita, Ricardo. (2012). Diccionario Enciclopédico Larousse de la Gastronomía Mexicana. .

See also
Mexican cuisine
Beef

Beef dishes
Mexican cuisine